In chemistry, a hydrobromide is an acid salt resulting, or regarded as resulting, from the reaction of hydrobromic acid with an organic base (e.g. an amine). The compounds are similar to hydrochlorides.

Some drugs are formulated as hydrobromides, e.g. eletriptan hydrobromide.

See also 
Bromide, inorganic salts of hydrobromic acid
Bromine, the element Br
Free base (chemistry)

Acid salts
Salts
Organobromides